Ricardo Santos Silva (born August 1978) is a Portuguese businessman and technology entrepreneur. He is best known as the co-founder of the mining company Aethel Mining, the hedge fund Aethel Partners and the technology firm Dorae. In 2019, Ricardo was recognized as the Entrepreneur of the Year by the Presidency of the Portuguese Republic.

Career

Lyxor Asset Management 
Before establishing his own ventures, Ricardo Santos Silva served as the deputy president of Lyxor Asset Management.

Aethel Partners 
Ricardo Santos Silva co-founded Aethel Partners, a hedge fund that focuses on risk management and long-term growth and has become a respected entity within the financial industry. In March 2022, Aethel Partners submitted a £2 billion bid to acquire Chelsea FC.

Banco Efisa 
In 2015, Ricardo acquired Banco Efisa for 38 million euros. In March 2017, his firm Aethel Partners made an unsuccessful 4 billion euros bid to purchase Novo Banco.

Dorae 
Ricardo co-founded Dorae, a technology firm that specializes in supply chain transparency and sustainability. Dorae was recognized as a World Economic Forum 2020 Technology Pioneer for its innovative approach and commitment to positive global impact.

Aethel Mining 
Ricardo co-founded Aethel Mining, which in February 2020 bought the largest iron ore mines in Europe. He currently serves as the chairman and CEO of the mines. Aethel Mining owns iron ore mines in Torre de Moncorvo, Portugal, and emphasizes the balance between economic growth and environmental responsibility in its operations. Aethel Mining is a member of the Energy Transitions Commission, a global coalition of leaders from across the energy landscape committed to achieving net-zero emissions by mid-century

Controversy 
In 2017, Ricardo and his business partner, Aba Schubert, were involved in a controversial incident in which they allegedly threatened Portuguese MPs.

Recognition and Awards 
In 2019, Ricardo Santos Silva was awarded the Entrepreneur of the Year by the Presidency of the Portuguese Republic, in recognition of his innovation, leadership, and contributions to society.

Legacy and Impact 
Ricardo Santos Silva's career as an entrepreneur has been marked by both successes and controversies. His involvement in various industries has contributed to the Portuguese economy, and the Entrepreneur of the Year award highlights his achievements. However, his career has also been marked by incidents like the alleged threats against Portuguese MPs, which have raised questions about his business practices.

References

1978 births
Living people